is a former Japanese football player.

Playing career
Kurihara was born in Gunma Prefecture on May 2, 1985. After graduating from high school, he joined J1 League club Albirex Niigata in 2004. In June, he moved to Albirex Niigata Singapore. He returned to Albirex Niigata in 2006 season. In 2007, he moved to AC Nagano Parceiro. He retired in 2012.

References

1985 births
Living people
Association football people from Gunma Prefecture
Japanese footballers
J1 League players
Japan Football League players
Albirex Niigata players
AC Nagano Parceiro players
Association football midfielders